The 137th Pennsylvania House of Representatives District is located in Southeastern Pennsylvania and has been represented since 2011 by Joe Emrick.

District profile
The 137th Pennsylvania House of Representatives District is located in  Northampton County. It includes the Real Estate Building and the Bridge in Bangor Borough. It is made up of the following areas:

 Bethlehem Township
 Hanover Township (PART, District 05)
 Lower Nazareth Township
 Nazareth
 Palmer Township (PART)
 District Middle
 District Upper Eastern
 District Upper Western
 District Western (PART, Division 02)
 Tatamy
 Upper Nazareth Township

Representatives

Recent election results

References

External links
District map from the United States Census Bureau
Pennsylvania House Legislative District Maps from the Pennsylvania Redistricting Commission.  
Population Data for District 137 from the Pennsylvania Redistricting Commission.

Government of Northampton County, Pennsylvania
137